is a Japanese former footballer and former manager of Ehime FC.

Managerial statistics

References

External links

1969 births
Living people
Sportspeople from Ehime Prefecture
Association football people from Ehime Prefecture
Japanese footballers
Sanfrecce Hiroshima players
Ehime FC players
J2 League managers
Ehime FC managers
Japanese football managers
Association football defenders